George Zaven Hart (May 13, 1924 – January 31, 2013) was an American politician.

Born in Detroit, Michigan, Hart served in the United States Army during World War II. He went to Henry Ford Community College and then received his bachelor's degree from Wayne State University. Hart served on the Dearborn, Michigan city council from 1960 to 1970. He then served in the Michigan State Senate, as a Democrat from 1979 to 1982 and from 1987 to 2002. Hart also served on the Wayne County, Michigan Board of Commissioners from 1972 to 1978. He died in Albuquerque, New Mexico.

Notes

1924 births
2013 deaths
Politicians from Detroit
Politicians from Dearborn, Michigan
Military personnel from Detroit
Wayne State University alumni
Michigan city council members
County commissioners in Michigan
Democratic Party Michigan state senators
United States Army personnel of World War II